The Pentaphylacaceae are a small family of plants within the order Ericales. In the APG III system of 2009, it includes the former family Ternstroemiaceae.

Genera
In 2014, the Angiosperm Phylogeny Website included 14 genera in the family:  Plants of the World Online currently includes:
 Adinandra Jack
 Anneslea Wall.
 Archboldiodendron Kobuski
 Balthasaria Verdc.
 Cleyera Thunb.
 Eurya Thunb.
 Euryodendron Hung T.Chang
 Freziera Sw. ex Willd.
 Pentaphylax Gardner & Champ.
 Poeciloneuron Bedd.
 Symplococarpon Airy Shaw
 Ternstroemia Mutis ex L.f.
 Visnea L.f.

References

 
Ericales families